A parlay is a gambling term, a single bet that links together two or more individual wagers and is dependent on all of those wagers winning together.

Parlay may also refer to:
 Parlay Entertainment, Canadian-based developer of online bingo software 
 Parlay Group, a technical industry consortium
 Parlay X, a set of standard Web service APIs for the telephone network

See also

 Parley, a discussion or conference
 Par Par Lay (1947–2013), Burmese entertainer
 Parley (disambiguation)
 Parler (disambiguation)
 Parle (disambiguation)
 Parly